Thomas Santon (fl.1413–1417), was an English Member of Parliament.

He was a Member (MP) of the Parliament of England for City of York in May 1413 and 1417. He was Mayor of York 3 February 1414–15.

References

14th-century births
15th-century deaths
15th-century English people
People from York
Lord Mayors of York
Members of the Parliament of England (pre-1707)